Southridge High School is a 9 - 12th grade public secondary school, paired with a 6 - 8th grade middle school, one of four schools in the Southwest Dubois County School Corporation in Dubois County, Indiana.  It is located on the south side of Huntingburg on US 231.

Athletics
Southridge is a member of the Pocket Athletic Conference and a class 3A member of the IHSAA except for football, where they are 2A.  The school colors are red, black and white and the sports teams are called the Raiders.

The Raiders were the 1998 2A girls' basketball state champions. Southridge also won the 2017 2A football state championship and were 2018 2A regional champions, causing them to be moved up into 3A. They are also back-to-back state runner-up in 2A baseball, which has also resulted in a move into 3A in that sport.

Notable alumni
Alex Graman—former MLB player for the New York Yankees, minor league player for the Cincinnati Reds, as well as the Saitama Seibu Lions (Japanese leagues) 
Mitch Stetter—former MLB player for the Milwaukee Brewers and minor league player for the Los Angeles Angels of Anaheim 
Tim Barrett—former MLB player for the Montreal Expos
Colson Montgomery—current MLB shortstop in the Chicago White Sox organization. Named Indiana’s 2021 Male Athlete of the year.

See also
 List of high schools in Indiana

References

External links
Southridge High School website
Southwest Dubois School Corporation Homepage

Public high schools in Indiana
Huntingburg, Indiana
High schools in Southwestern Indiana
Pocket Athletic Conference
Former Southern Indiana Athletic Conference members
Schools in Dubois County, Indiana
Educational institutions established in 1972
1972 establishments in Indiana